Dekheila is a neighborhood in Alexandria, Egypt with a large seaport. It is located 7 miles west of Alexandria and the seaport is an extension of the port located in Alexandria.

Dekheila is the probable location of the ancient Christian monastic complex of the Pempton at the fifth milestone west of Alexandria. There is evidence of a Gaianite community there.

See also 

 Neighborhoods in Alexandria

References

Populated places in Alexandria Governorate
Neighbourhoods of Alexandria